Money on the Street is a 1930 Austrian-German romantic comedy film directed by Georg Jacoby and starring Lydia Pollman, Georg Alexander, and Franz Schafheitlin. It is notable for the screen debut of Hedy Lamarr, who played a small role as an extra.

Plot
A young woman tries to escape her fate of marriage to a dull, but wealthy fiancée.

Cast

Production
The film was made by Sascha Film, Austria's largest production company, at the Sievering Studios in Vienna. It was the first sound film made in Austria, facilitated by an agreement made with the German firm Tobis Film who supplied the sound recording equipment. The story was adapted from a play by Rudolf Bernauer. The film's art direction was by Hans Jacoby and Emil Stepanek.

References

External links

1930 romantic comedy films
Austrian romantic comedy films
Films of the Weimar Republic
German romantic comedy films
Films directed by Georg Jacoby
Films set in Vienna
Films shot in Vienna
German films based on plays
Films shot at Sievering Studios
1930s German films